Big Beach Boutique II was a free concert held on 13 July 2002 by English DJ Fatboy Slim (Norman Cook) on Brighton Beach, Brighton, England. The concert was attended by over 250,000 people, four times the expected 60,000. Due to the far higher than expected attendance the local authorities were severely underprepared, which lead to many incidents including two deaths, over 170 injuries, and six arrests.

Concert 
On the day of the concert Sussex Police reportedly considered cancelling the event due to the vast numbers of people, but decided not to as they feared a riot. The concert was attended by more than 250,000 people, double the city's population at the time and more than four times the 60,000 expected attendance and more than three times the 80,000 maximum which had been planned for.

The A23 road was backed up past Gatwick Airport, more than 25 miles away from the huge numbers of people travelling to Brighton. Abandoned cars were left along the coast to nearby Hove.

As a result of the enormous crowds, the local authorities, such as the police and ambulance service, were very underprepared.

Several hours before the concert started, the beach was crammed with people. In a live TV interview on his seafront balcony at The Grand Hotel, Fatboy Slim said: "I'm quite scared".

During the concert, people clung to ambulances to escape the crowds. A coastguard helicopter hovered over the shoreline throughout the evening, with scores of unconscious people being rescued from the sea. Paul Cruise, who attended the concert, said that "all of the seafront hotel balconies were packed and people were hanging off lamp posts and railings". As the tide came in, people were reportedly "up to their necks in the water", and small boats had to rescue many of them from the sea.

After the concert ended, the hordes of people who attended the concert began to make their way home. People clung to the doors of trains to try and prise them open and buses were forced to operate unplanned night services to ferry the crowds out.

Casualties were taken from the beach by lifeboats because the streets were too jammed for ambulances to easily access it. Ambulances and stretcher parties could not reach treatment centres, and some crews were abused by drunks. A total of 160 people received minor injuries from the event, with a further 11 being taken to hospital. Among the injuries were two broken legs and a broken back. After the event, an Australian nurse was seriously injured and later died after falling from the Upper Esplanade, and a 45-year old man died from a heart attack. Another six people were arrested for assault, drugs and public order offences.

Aftermath 
Thousands of people were marooned and forced to sleep on the beach because of a lack of trains, with the last train to London leaving 15 minutes after the concert finished.

After the concert the beach was covered in litter, mostly broken glass, and the smell of urine filled the air as people had been forced to urinate where they were standing. There was no rain for days after the concert, so the council was eventually forced to bulldoze the shingle back into the sea to clean the beach. The cleanup operation cost £300,000, which was entirely paid for by Cook. Of the police on duty, half required trauma counselling.

The council subsequently decided to restrict future concerts on the beach, fearing a repeat of the concert's events. They considered banning events like it entirely, but decided they would go ahead after appropriate safety guidelines were approved.

Right Here, Right Now 
A feature-length documentary titled Right Here, Right Now, a reference to Fatboy Slim's song of the same title, was released on Sky Documentaries on 4 February 2023. The documentary recounts the events of the concert and includes video interviews on the day of the event, and clippings from newspapers, magazines, and other publications, both positive and negative.

References 

2002 in England
Brighton
Concert disasters
Concerts in the United Kingdom